S mode may refer to:
 S mode (photography), shutter priority mode in electronically controlled camera
 S-mode 1, 1st single compilation album by Masami Okui
 S-mode 2, 2nd single compilation album by Masami Okui
 S-mode 3, 3rd single compilation album by Masami Okui
 Mode S, an aviation transponder interrogation mode
 Windows 10 S Mode (now also in Windows 11), a variant of the Windows operating system